The Kearny School, at 800 S. 3rd St. in Raton, New Mexico, was built in 1936.  It was listed on the National Register of Historic Places in 1996.

It was a Public Works Administration project.

Architecture: Art Deco
Historic function: Education
Historic subfunction: Library

References

Schools in New Mexico
National Register of Historic Places in Colfax County, New Mexico
Art Deco architecture in New Mexico
Buildings and structures completed in 1936